Ricardo Alberto Medeiros Chaves (born 27 October 1977) is a Portuguese retired footballer who played as a central midfielder, and is a manager.

Club career
Born in Valpaços, Vila Real District, Chaves started playing for local club Vila Pouca FC. He went on to represent neighbouring G.D. Chaves (two games in the Primeira Liga in the 1998–99 season, his first as a professional, plus five years in the second division), Vitória de Setúbal and S.C. Braga.

In 2008, while at Setúbal for the second time in his career, Chaves won the inaugural edition of the Portuguese League Cup, in a penalty shootout win against Sporting CP. He played the full 120 minutes in the final.

Chaves moved to Rio Ave F.C. in late June 2009, after being instrumental in Setúbal's consecutive narrow top-flight relegation escapes – he only missed two league matches in his two seasons. After being regularly used during his tenure, the 33-year-old returned to the second level and signed with C.D. Aves.

Honours
Vitória de Setúbal
Taça de Portugal: 2004–05
Taça da Liga: 2007–08

References

External links

1977 births
Living people
People from Valpaços
Portuguese footballers
Association football midfielders
Primeira Liga players
Liga Portugal 2 players
Segunda Divisão players
G.D. Chaves players
Vitória F.C. players
S.C. Braga players
Rio Ave F.C. players
C.D. Aves players
SC Mirandela players
Portuguese football managers
Sportspeople from Vila Real District